Macrobathra synastra is a moth in the family Cosmopterigidae. It was described by Edward Meyrick in 1886. It is found in Australia.

References

Macrobathra
Moths described in 1886